Charles Peter Mok, JP (born 1964 in Hong Kong) is a Hong Kong-based Internet entrepreneur and IT advocate who formerly represents the Information Technology functional constituency on the Hong Kong Legislative Council.

Mok founded HKNet in 1994, and contributed the company's expansion as a major IP telecommunications operator in Hong Kong before its acquisition by NTT Communications in 2000. He was a founding chairman of Internet Society, Hong Kong Chapter, and the ex officio member and ex-president of the Hong Kong Information Technology Federation. He was also a past chairman and a co-founder of the Hong Kong Internet Service Providers Association. He is currently a Hong Kong Legislative Councillor.

He has been actively promoting the industry's development and digital comprehension in the region since the early 1990s. He has been actively participating in the community to promote fair competition, media freedom, personal privacy, consumer protection, healthcare, transport, human rights and democracy development in Hong Kong. In 1999, he was awarded as one of Hong Kong's " Ten Outstanding Young Digi Persons”.

Mok is currently a regular columnist for a number of local print media, including the Hong Kong Economic Journal (since 2000) and CUP magazine (since 2005).

In Hong Kong's 2008 Legislative Council Election, Mok lost to Samson Tam in the Information Technology functional constituency with 1982 votes, just 35 fewer than Tam's total of 2017 votes.  Mok commenced a legal action in the High Court of Hong Kong against Tam in relation to the latter's alleged misconduct during campaigning.

In the 2012 election, Mok won the Information Technology seat with 2,828 votes, against 2,063 votes for the incumbent, his only opponent, Tam. He was reelected his Legislative Council seat in the 2016 election.

Education
Mok attended Wah Yan College, Hong Kong (Class of 1981), a Roman Catholic single-gender secondary school in Hong Kong. He received his bachelor's and master's degrees, in 1985 and 1987 respectively, in Electrical Engineering from Purdue University, United States. Mok was a PhD candidate in Enterprise Management at Shanghai University of Finance and Economics, People's Republic of China.

Electoral history

2008 Hong Kong legislative election

2012 Hong Kong legislative election

2016 Hong Kong legislative election

Public services
 Professional Commons, Vice-Chairman (2008– )
 Internet Society Hong Kong Chairman
 Hong Kong Information Technology Federation Ex officio Member; Past President (2001–05)
 Hong Kong Computer Society Chair, Health Information Technology Special Interest Division
 Hong Kong Internet Service Providers Association Past chairman (1998-00)
 Web-based Services and Computer Network Working Group, Vice-Chairman, Chairman.
 Supporting Services Development Committee, Vice-Chairman.
 Radio Television Hong Kong Member, Television Programme Advisory Committee
 HK Human Rights Monitor Founding Member
 Hong Kong Democratic Foundation, director

Publication
"Innovation and Entrepreneurship Support Policy by Government: HKSAR as Example”, “Waiguo Jingji Yu Guanli” (“Foreign Economics and Management”) Journal Vol. 28, Shanghai University of Finance and Economics, August 2006

See also
HKNet
Mok
Hong Kong Human Rights Monitor

References

External links
HKIRC
Official Site
IT360 Newsletter for the Hong Kong IT Industry

Living people
1965 births
Hong Kong Christians
Alumni of Wah Yan
Hong Kong financial businesspeople
HK LegCo Members 2012–2016
HK LegCo Members 2016–2021
Members of the Election Committee of Hong Kong, 2007–2012
Members of the Election Committee of Hong Kong, 2012–2017
Shanghai University of Finance and Economics alumni